Telochurus is a genus of tussock moths in the family Erebidae erected by Koen V. N. Maes in 1984.

Species
Telochurus diplosticta (Collenette, 1933)
Telochurus recens (Hübner, 1819) – scarce vapourer moth

References

Lymantriinae
Moth genera